Thomas Xenakis (March 30, 1875 – July 7, 1942) was a Greek gymnast.  He competed at the 1896 Summer Olympics in Athens. He was born in Naxos and died in Orange, California, United States.

Xenakis competed in the rope climbing event.  He and countryman Nikolaos Andriakopoulos were the only two out of the five entrants to climb all the way to the top of the 14 metre rope.  Xenakis' time is unknown, though it was slower than 23.4 seconds, which was Andriakopoulos's winning time.

He won his second silver medal as a member of the Greek gymnastics team in the parallel bars event.

References

External links

1875 births
1942 deaths
Greek male artistic gymnasts
Olympic gymnasts of Greece
Gymnasts at the 1896 Summer Olympics
19th-century sportsmen
Olympic silver medalists for Greece
Olympic medalists in gymnastics
Medalists at the 1896 Summer Olympics
People from Naxos